Picking quarrels and provoking trouble, also translated as picking quarrels and stirring up trouble or picking quarrels and making trouble, is a crime under the law of the People's Republic of China.

The official translation of this crime is "disrupt public order".

Overview
It comes under article 293 of the 1997 revision of the People's Republic of China's Penal Code, and carries a maximum sentence of five years. The former offense of "hooliganism" was removed in the same revision of the penal code.

The crime is defined as undermining public order by creating a disturbance in a public place. It is a type of criminal disorderly conduct.

As this is an ill-defined crime, it has frequently been used as an excuse to arrest human rights activists, civil rights activists, and lawyers in China, and hold them in detention pending more serious charges such as inciting subversion of state power.

Text of the law

Article 293 of the 1997 Criminal Code of the People's Republic of China:

Article 293.   Whoever undermines public order with anyone of the following provocative and disturbing behaviors is to be sentenced to not more than five years of fixed-term imprisonment, criminal detention, or control:

(1) willfully attacking another person and the circumstances are bad; 
(2) chasing, intercepting, or cursing another person, and the circumstances are bad;
(3) forcibly taking away, demanding, or willfully damaging or seizing public or private property; and the circumstances are serious;
(4) creating a disturbance in a public place, causing serious disorder.

Discussion

Zhu Zhengfu, a delegate to the Chinese People's Political Consultative Conference and vice-chair of the All China Lawyers Association, said that the law's "legal ambiguity breeds room for selective law enforcement, damages the public’s legal interests and undermines judicial credibility." Zhu argued in 2022 that the law should be eliminated.

List of notable people charged with picking quarrels and provoking trouble
 Li Tingting (李婷婷), Wei Tingting (韦婷婷), Zheng Churan (郑楚然), Wu Rongrong (武嵘嵘), and Wang Man (王曼) (see Arrest of Chinese Feminists in 2015)
 Cao Shunli, a lawyer and human rights activist who was arrested at Beijing Airport in September 2013, and subsequently died in detention in March 2014
 Huang Xueqin (黄雪琴), a journalist who was prominent in China's Me Too movement and who wrote about the 2019–20 Hong Kong protests was arrested for "picking quarrels and provoking trouble" in October 2019
 Liu Ping
 Nankezhou (南柯舟)
 Pu Zhiqiang
 Qin Huohuo
 Tie Liu
  (肖传国)
 Yang Maodong, a Chinese human rights lawyer, was sentenced to six years in prison in 2015 after being charged with disturbing public order and "picking quarrels and provoking trouble".
 Zhang Zhan (张展), a citizen journalist who reported on the COVID-19 outbreak in Wuhan was arrested in May 2020, and sentenced to four years in prison for "picking quarrels and provoking trouble" in December 2020.
 Zhao Lianhai
  (周莉)
 Sun Dawu, a billionaire sentenced to eighteen years in prison in July 2021.

See also

List of Chinese dissidents
Law of the People's Republic of China

References

Chinese law
Political repression in China